New Year is an opera in three acts by composer Michael Tippett, who wrote his own libretto. It was first performed by Houston Grand Opera on 27 October 1989, in a production by Peter Hall.

Tippett has noted that the "primary metaphor" of the opera is dance. The choreographer of the original production was the noted American dancer Bill T. Jones.

Performance history
The first UK production was at Glyndebourne, and subsequently Glyndebourne Touring Opera presented an adapted version of Peter Hall's production. As with Tippett's other operas, the text and music encompass a widely eclectic range of cultural references.

Roles

Synopsis
The story of the opera moves between two worlds, of "Somewhere and Today" and "Nowhere and Tomorrow".

Act 1
Jo Ann is a child psychologist who wants to work with young victims of the urban conflict going on in "Terror Town" outside of her domicile.  However, she is so afraid of Terror Town that she does not venture out of the apartment.  Her Rastafarian foster brother Donny is generally delinquent in his behaviour towards her and their mutual foster mother, Nan.  Out of nowhere, a spaceship emerges, carrying Merlin, a "computer wizard", and the pilot Pelegrin, under the leadership of Regan.  These are time travelers from the future, and the ship makes a connection with Jo Ann's apartment.

Act 2
It is centered at a New Year's festivity.  A shaman, in a trance, induces the crowd of revellers to pummel Donny as part of the celebration.  The space ship arrives and Merlin asserts his authority over the activities.  Jo Ann and Pelegrin do meet, but they are separated when the spaceship leaves the scene.  Jo Ann saves Donny from the beating crowd, and the act ends to the sounds of the traditional song "Auld Lang Syne".

Act 3
Pelegrin presents Jo Ann with a symbolic rose, as a symbol of their love.  She loses the rose, but he recovers it.  Jo Ann is finally cured of her fears and can go out again into the world outside of her home.  The Presenter summarizes the final message as:  "One humanity, one justice".

References

External links
 Meirion Bowen, "Michael Tippett´s New Year: A Modern Masque" (2003), from Michael Tippett web page

Operas by Michael Tippett
English-language operas
1989 operas
Operas
Opera world premieres at Houston Grand Opera
Science fiction operas